Henry Craven may refer to:

 Henry Thornton Craven (1818–1905), English actor and dramatist
 Henry Smith Craven (1845–1889), American inventor, civil and military engineer